During the 2001–02 season, Middlesbrough participated in the FA Premier League.

Kit
Middlesbrough were again sponsored by BT Cellnet for the 2001–02 season. The team's strip was produced by Errea. The home shirt consisted of a plain red shirt, red shorts and red socks with white trim. The away strip consisted of blue and black striped shirts, plain black shorts and black socks.

Final league table

Results summary

Results by round

Notable events
 Steve McClaren's first season in charge of Boro.
 Boro lost their first four matches in the league but then recover to only lose 2 in 11 games.
 1–0 win away at Manchester United one of the high points of the league campaign.
 Strong FA Cup run ended in the semi finals with a 1–0 loss to Arsenal at Old Trafford. A Gianluca Festa own goal is the difference between the two sides.

Squad
Squad at end of season

Left club during season

Transfers

In

Out
For departures of players out of contract at the end of 2000–01 see 2000-01 Middlesbrough F.C. season.

Results

Premier League

Note: Results are given with Middlesbrough score listed first.

FA Cup

League Cup

Statistics

Appearances and goals

|-
! colspan=14 style=background:#dcdcdc; text-align:center| Goalkeepers

|-
! colspan=14 style=background:#dcdcdc; text-align:center| Defenders

|-
! colspan=14 style=background:#dcdcdc; text-align:center| Midfielders

|-
! colspan=14 style=background:#dcdcdc; text-align:center| Forwards

|-
! colspan=14 style=background:#dcdcdc; text-align:center| Players transferred out during the season

Goalscorers
Goalscoring statistics for 2001-02.

Starting 11
Considering starts in all competitions
 GK: #1,  Mark Schwarzer, 25
 RB: #27,  Robbie Stockdale, 34
 CB: #6,  Gareth Southgate, 48
 CB: #17,  Ugo Ehiogu, 33
 LB: #37,  Franck Queudrue, 34
 RM: #23,  Carlos Marinelli, 16
 CM: #9,  Paul Ince, 36
 CM: #7,  Robbie Mustoe, 38
 LM: #12,  Jonathan Greening, 40
 CF: #11,  Alen Boksic, 23
 CF: #26,  Noel Whelan, 23

Notes

References

Middlesbrough F.C. seasons
Middlesbrough